The Cross Internacional de Atapuerca is an annual cross country running competition that takes place in Atapuerca, Spain. Established in 2004, it takes place in early November and is among the first major competitions of the cross country season. In its initial years, it was usually the first permit meeting in the European Athletic Association's cross country season, and it now begins the IAAF Permit Meeting series, having replaced the Cross de Soria event in 2010.

The Cross de Atapuerca has attracted high calibre athletes, including World Cross Country Champions Gebregziabher Gebremariam and Leonard Komon, and Linet Masai. Around 2500 athletes took part in the 2009 race, which was broadcast on Teledeporte, the sports channel of Spain's state broadcaster TVE. It is part of the Spanish cross country running circuit and was ranked as the country's second best meet in 2008.

The distances for the professional senior competitions are 9 km for men and 8 km for women. In addition to the elite races, a separate mass race is held for amateur runners. The Cross de Atapuerca also features a number of different categories and distances based on age: four levels for children, youth (under 16s) and junior (under 18s) competitions, and finally a masters race for runners over 35.

The course of the race traces a path through the fields around the town of Atapuerca and passes through the Archaeological Site of Atapuerca before looping back to complete a circuit.

Past elite race winners

See also
European Cross Country Championships

References

External links
Official website 
ANOC profile 
Race profile from RFEA 



Cross country running competitions
Athletics competitions in Spain
Recurring sporting events established in 2004
2004 establishments in Spain
Cross country running in Spain